Saint-Alban-Auriolles is a commune in the Ardèche department in southern France.

Geography
The river Chassezac flows into the Ardèche in the commune.

Population

See also
Communes of the Ardèche department

References

Communes of Ardèche
Ardèche communes articles needing translation from French Wikipedia